Don't Worry About Your Mother-in-Law is a 1954 West German comedy film directed by Erich Engels and starring Grethe Weiser, Lonny Kellner and Claus Biederstaedt. It was shot at the Wandsbek Studios in Hamburg with sets designed by the art directors Mathias Matthies and Ellen Schmidt,

Plot 
Martin Hoffmann is an employee of the Günzlow tobacco company, where there are many pretty girls, above all the chief secretary Renate Winter, who has his eye on him. This in turn annoys his girlfriend Gisela Steinberg, who now simply says that she is pregnant. So she wants to bind Martin even closer to her. He is very receptive to the marriage he is considering, as he loves her too. Only Mathilde Steinberg, Gisela's mother and caring wife of the music professor Steinberg, is against marriage because she sees no future for the two of them due to their low income. But because of the lie about the expected child, she agrees. Since the young couple does not yet have their own apartment, they have to live in a furnished room with their parents. Martin is bothered by the piano lessons his father-in-law gives, but his mother-in-law's constant interference is much more annoying. So they have to find their own apartment and move pretty quickly. But now happens what the mother-in-law foresaw. Martin's income does not allow you to set up a household. The beautiful furnishings could only be bought in installments. The debts grew over their heads, and the bailiff was not long in coming.

When Gisela talks to her friend Lily, she finds a way out of the precarious situation that Martin doesn't need to know about. A friend of mine named Mayer, a hosiery manufacturer, is looking for mannequins and he pays very well. So it didn't take long before Gisela brought home the first 50 marks of self-earned money and gave it to Martin. So that he didn't worry, she told him that it would be a lottery win. He still believes in the approaching stork and, to Gisela's horror, buys a used stroller without thinking about the furniture installments that are still outstanding. But when Martin then finds out where the money really comes from, that the children are not ready yet and that her behavior towards the stocking manufacturer also suggests more intimate connections, his heart bursts and Gisela moves back to her parents. The next step is to contact a divorce lawyer.

At first she likes the role of the offended diva, but then she realizes that her love for her husband is very strong. She secretly goes back to her own apartment to bring about a reconciliation. She had suffered from the thought of a lonely, unhappy man and now finds Renate Winter with him. Gisela rushes away, offended again. But Renate had only come to see if things were going right. Not without the help of Gisela's smaller siblings, the two get back together and are really expecting a baby.

Cast
 Grethe Weiser as Mathilde Steinberg
 Lonny Kellner as Gisela Steinberg
 Claus Biederstaedt as Martin Hoffmann
 Paul Westermeier as Direktor Günzlow
 Walter Janssen as Professor Steinberg
 Marianne Wischmann as Renate Winter
 Bum Krüger as Direktor Meyer
 Beppo Brem as Fritz Fränkel
 Helga Braend as Helga Steinberg
 Ursula Herking
 Roland Kaiser as Herbert Steinberg
 Ingrid Lutz as Lilly
 Maria Paudler
 Erich Ponto
 Ruth Stephan
 Hubert von Meyerinck

References

Bibliography
 Bock, Hans-Michael & Bergfelder, Tim. The Concise CineGraph. Encyclopedia of German Cinema. Berghahn Books, 2009.

External links 
 

1954 films
1954 comedy films
German comedy films
West German films
1950s German-language films
Films directed by Erich Engels
German black-and-white films
1950s German films
Films shot at Wandsbek Studios